For the East West Trail in Clearwater, Florida see Ream Wilson Clearwater Trail

The East West Trail is a trail on Bougainville that runs from Mawareka and Mosigetta, to Buin in the south.  It was wide and cleared and skirted around the coastal swamps. 

The trail featured during the Bougainville campaign during World War II with a number of battles fought along the trail.

Geography of Papua New Guinea
Hiking in Papua New Guinea